Fatface may refer to:
Fat Face, a British clothing retailer
Fat face typefaces, a style of typeface popular in the nineteenth century